The R291 road is a regional road in Ireland linking Sligo and Rosses Point in County Sligo. The road is part of the Wild Atlantic Way.

The road travels along the southern coast of the Rosses Point Peninsula via Ballincar.

The Urban Cycle Sligo travel scheme route 006 linking Rosses Point to Scotsmans Walk in Sligo Town with dedicated cycle lanes created on the R291 road.

See also
Roads in Ireland

References

Regional roads in the Republic of Ireland
Roads in County Sligo